The Santiago Baháʼí House of Worship or Santiago Baháʼí Temple is a Baháʼí House of Worship located in Santiago, Chile that opened in 2016. It is circular and composed of nine arched "sails" made from marble and cast glass. Like all Baháʼí Houses of Worship, it is open to all regardless of religion or any other distinction. The temple was designed by Canadian architect Siamak Hariri and has won several awards from Canadian and international architecture organizations.

History
In 1953, Shoghi Effendi, then head of the Baháʼí Faith, decided that a continental House of Worship for South America would be built in Chile. In 2001, the Universal House of Justice said efforts should begin to construct the "Mother Temple of South America." Then, in late 2002, the National Spiritual Assembly of the Baháʼís of Chile announced a competition for the design of the temple, to be built southeast of Santiago. The chosen design was by Siamak Hariri of Hariri Pontarini Architects in Toronto, Ontario, Canada.

Fabrication of components began in 2007. The construction phase started in November 2010, construction of the cast glass cladding commenced in October 2014, and construction was completed in October 2016. The temple was dedicated on October 13, 2016 and doors opened to the public on October 19, 2016.

Architecture

All Baháʼí Houses of Worship are circular and nine-sided. Accordingly, the Santiago temple is ringed by nine entrances, nine pathways, and nine fountains, and the structure is composed of nine arching "sails." These have also been described as nine "petals" and the temple's shape as "floral"; the "petals" are separated by glass which allows light to illuminate the temple's interior. The exterior of the "petals" is made from cast glass while the interior is made from Portuguese marble. The sides of the temple are held up on the inside by a steel and aluminum superstructure. The temple can seat 600 people and it is 30 metres high and 30 metres in diameter.

Purpose
The Baháʼí Faith teaches that a House of Worship should be a space for people of all religions to gather, reflect, and worship. Anyone may enter the temple irrespective of religious background, sex, or other distinctions, as is the case with all Baháʼí Houses of Worship. The sacred writings of the Baháʼí Faith as well as other religions can be read and/or chanted inside. Musical renditions of readings and prayers can be sung by choirs, but no musical instruments can be played inside. There is no set pattern for worship services, and ritualistic ceremonies are not permitted. Despite these functions, most Baháʼí gatherings in the world are held in private homes, local Baháʼí centres, or rented facilities. The Santiago Baháʼí House of Worship serves as the continental House of Worship for South America and it was the last continental House of Worship to be completed.

Visitors
According to the Baháʼí World News Service, the Santiago House of Worship had received over 40,000 visitors by December 6, 2016. On November 6, 2019, the same organization reported that over 1.4 million people had visited the temple.

Awards

 International Architecture Award from the Chicago Athenaeum, 2017
 Innovation in Architecture Award from the Royal Architectural Institute of Canada, 2017
 Innovation Award (category: Stellar Design) from the American Institute of Architects, 2017
 American Architecture Prize (category: Architectural Design / Cultural Architecture), 2017
 Design Excellence Award from the Ontario Association of Architects, 2018
 Award for "Best in Americas, Civil Buildings" from World Architecture News, 2018
 Structural Award from the Institution of Structural Engineers, 2019
 International Prize from the Royal Architectural Institute of Canada, 2019

See also
 Lotus Temple
 Chicago Baháʼí House of Worship
 Sydney Baháʼí Temple
 Baháʼí teachings
 Prayer in the Baháʼí Faith
 Baháʼí Faith in South America
 Tourism in Chile
 Religion in Chile

References

External links
 
 Photo gallery provided by the Baháʼí Media Bank
 Photo gallery provided by Hariri Pontarini Architects

Bahá'í House of Worship
Buildings and structures in Santiago
Siamak Hariri buildings
2016 establishments in Chile
Religious buildings and structures completed in 2016